This page lists the table tennis events for 2014.

 January 9 – December 14: 2014 ITTF Calendar of Events
 April 28 – May 5: 2014 World Team Table Tennis Championships in  Tokyo
  claimed both men's and women's team titles.
 August 17–23: 2014 Summer Youth Olympics
 Boys' singles   FAN Zhendong;   Yuto Muramatsu;   Hugo Calderano
 Girls' singles   LIU Gaoyang;   DOO Hoi Kem;   Lily Zhang
 Mixed international team:   FAN Zhendong / LIU Gaoyang;   Miyu Kato / Yuto Muramatsu;   DOO Hoi Kem / HUNG Ka Tak 
 October 17–19: Women's World Cup in  Linz
 Winner:  Ding Ning; Second:  Li Xiaoxia; Third:  Kasumi Ishikawa
 October 24–26: Men's World Cup in  Düsseldorf
 Winner:  Zhang Jike; Second:  Ma Long; Third:  Timo Boll
 November 30 – December 7: 2014 World Junior Table Tennis Championships at  Shanghai
 Host nation, swept all the gold medals for this event. China won the overall medal tally as well.

References

 
Table tennis by year